The Thomas Edison Depot Museum (previously the Grand Trunk Western Railroad Depot) is a former railway depot located at 520 State Street in Port Huron, Michigan. It has been converted into a museum. The building was listed on the National Register of Historic Places in 1977.

History
The Canadian Grand Trunk Railway Company constructed this building as the Gratiot Railway Station in 1858. It served as a major port for immigrants passing from Canada into the United States, and by 1869, approximately 42,000 immigrants had passed through the station. Near the station lived a young  Thomas Edison, who worked at the station as a news butcher from 1859 to 1863.

A larger, two-story station was constructed in 1907 to replace the 1858 depot (the 1907 depot was used until 1971 and demolished in 1973). In approximately the mid-1920s, the 1858 depot was converted to office space by the Peerless Cement Company.

Thomas Edison Depot Museum

The Port Huron Museum opened the Thomas Edison Depot Museum in the building in 2001. The depot is owned and operated by the Port Huron Museum and is the actual depot that Thomas Edison worked out of as a news butcher.  The museum includes a restored baggage car resting on a short spur of railroad track. The museum houses artifacts from the archaeological dig done at the site of his boyhood home, which burned in 1870.  See and hear original Edison phonographs played, see the world's largest light bulb and learn about the early days of this famous inventor.

Description
The Grand Trunk Western Railroad Depot is a single story rectangular seven-bay structure located near the Blue Water Bridge. The building has wood siding, and is topped with a low gabled roof. The roof is supported by gracefully carved brackets. It has a variety of windows throughout the building, including ocular vent openings suggestive of the elegance of the Italian Villa Style.

See also
Thomas Edison

Notes

External links

Thomas Edison Depot

Edison
Depot Museum
Museums in St. Clair County, Michigan
Port Huron, Michigan
History museums in Michigan
Railroad museums in Michigan
National Register of Historic Places in St. Clair County, Michigan
Railway stations in the United States opened in 1858
Grand Trunk Railway stations
Railway stations on the National Register of Historic Places in Michigan
Repurposed railway stations in the United States
Italianate architecture in Michigan
Transportation in St. Clair County, Michigan
Former railway stations in Michigan